The Kofiau monarch (Symposiachrus julianae) is a species of bird in the family Monarchidae. It is endemic to Kofiau in Indonesia.

Taxonomy and systematics
This species was originally classified in the genus Monarcha until moved to Symposiachrus in 2009. Alternate names for the Kofiau monarch include the black-backed monarch and Kofiau monarch flycatcher.

References

Symposiachrus
Birds of the Raja Ampat Islands
Birds described in 1959
Taxonomy articles created by Polbot